Dirty Weaponry is the second studio album by American hip hop group Killarmy. It was released on August 11, 1998 through Wu-Tang/Priority Records.

Background
Production was mainly handled by member 4th Disciple, except for two tracks that were produced by Allah Mathematics and a track produced by Russ Prez, with the RZA serving as executive producer. It features guest appearances from Wu-Tang Clan affiliate Black Knights member the Holocaust. The album peaked at number 40 on the Billboard 200 and number 13 on the Top R&B/Hip-Hop Albums in the United States.

Track listing

Personnel
Terrance "9th Prince" Hamlin – performer (tracks: 1-7, 9-11, 13)
Domingo "Dom Pachino" Del Valle – performer (tracks: 1-3, 5-11, 13)
Samuel "Beretta 9" Murray – performer (tracks: 1, 3, 5-8, 12)
Rodney "Islord" Stevenson – performer (tracks: 1-3, 5, 8, 10)
Jeryl "Killa Sin" Grant – performer (tracks: 3, 5, 8, 11-13)
Jamal "ShoGun Assasson" Alexander – performer (tracks: 3, 4, 9, 12)
Anthony "Warcloud" Brown – performer (tracks: 6, 9)
Selwyn "4th Disciple" Bougard – producer (tracks: 2-8, 11-13), mixing, arranging
Ronald "Mathematics" Bean – producer (tracks: 1, 9)
Russell "Russ Prez" Pressley – producer (track 10)
Robert "RZA" Diggs – executive producer
Rachelle Clinton – photography
Sherin Baday – coordinator
Arlene Godfrey – coordinator
Jeff Trotter – A&R

Charts

References

External links

1998 albums
Killarmy albums
Priority Records albums
Albums produced by Mathematics
Albums produced by 4th Disciple